Adalbert Bela Pall (1 April 1918 - 1 August 2001) was a Romanian football midfielder.

International career
Adalbert Pall played five matches at international level for Romania, including three at the 1947 and 1948 Balkan Cup editions.

Honours
Flamura Roșie Arad
Divizia A: 1946–47, 1947–48, 1950
Cupa României: 1947–48

References

External links

Adalbert Pall at Labtof.ro

1918 births
2001 deaths
Romanian footballers
Romania international footballers
Association football midfielders
Liga I players
Nemzeti Bajnokság I players
Victoria Cluj players
FC UTA Arad players
Romanian expatriate footballers
Expatriate footballers in Hungary
Expatriate sportspeople in Hungary
Romanian expatriates in Hungary
Romanian expatriate sportspeople in Hungary
Sportspeople from Cluj-Napoca